The following are the national records in athletics in East Timor maintained by its national athletics federation: Federaçao Timor-Leste de Atletismo (FTA).

Outdoor

Key to tables:

h = hand timing

Men

Women

Indoor

Men

Women

References

External links

East Timor
Records
Athletics
Athletics